Adan is a 2023 Pakistani television series produced by Shazia Wajahat under banner Showcase Productions and directed by Azeem Sajjad. It stars Mansha Pasha, Junaid Khan and Azfar Rehman in leading roles.

Cast 

 Mansha Pasha as Adan
 Junaid Khan as Zaid
 Azfar Rehman as Faraz
Sabiha Hashmi as Zaid's Grandmother
Shehryar Zaidi as Zaid's Grandfather
Amber Wajid as Shahana, Zaid's mother
Sajid Shah as Zaid's father
Umer Aalam as Fakhar, Zaid's brother
Shazia Qaiser as Safia, Adan's mother
Shehzad Mukhtar as Adan's stepfather 
Eman Zaidi as Tooba, Adan's friend
Rashid Farooqui as Faraz's father
Salma Asim as Faraz's mother
Hina Javed as Mawra, Faraz's friend
Irfan Motiwala as Jabbar Malik
Raja Shahid as Akbar
Amir Foga as Acchu
Kashif Rafiq as Jeeda

Production 

In July 2022, it reported that Pasha, Khan and Rehman will play the lead roles in Showcase Productions' next TV seris. Previously, Sanam Jung was selected to play the female lead but later she was replaced by Pasha, who made her fourth appearance opposite Khan after Dil-e-Beqarar, Madiha Maliha and Zara Aur Mehrunnisa.

References 

2023 Pakistani television series debuts